Agonopterix perstrigella is a moth of the family Depressariidae. It is found in France and Spain.

References

Moths described in 1925
Agonopterix
Moths of Europe